Valery Leonidovich Kornienko (born 13 March 1961 in Piterka) is a former Soviet pair skater. With partner Elena Bechke, he is the 1986 European bronze medalist and 1984 Skate Canada champion. They split in 1987.

Results 
with Bechke

References

External links

 Sports-Reference: Yelena Bechke
 Bechke and Kornienko at 1984 Prize of Moscow News, 22 December 1984. (RIA Novosti)
 Bechke and Kornienko at 1985 Prize of Moscow News, 1 December 1985. (RIA Novosti)

Living people
1961 births
Figure skaters from Saint Petersburg
Soviet male pair skaters
European Figure Skating Championships medalists
Universiade medalists in figure skating
Honoured Masters of Sport of the USSR
Universiade silver medalists for the Soviet Union
Competitors at the 1987 Winter Universiade